The 1895 Greensburg Athletic Association season was their sixth season in existence. The team finished 9–1–1 or 8–2–1.

Schedule

Game notes

References

Greensburg Athletic Association
Greensburg Athletic Association seasons
Greensburg Athletic Association